Juvenile Liaison 1 (1975) and Juvenile Liaison 2 (1990) are documentary films by award winning film director Nick Broomfield about a juvenile liaison project in Blackburn, Lancashire. The first film examines a series of children and their run-ins with the law, over minor wrongdoings such as apple theft. The second film revisits some of the characters from the first, in some sort of attempt to measure the success of the scheme.

The original film was funded by the British Film Institute, who controlled its distribution. When the subject matter became known, Lancashire Constabulary, the police force featured, put pressure on the families of the participants to withdraw their consent, and after taking legal advice the BFI did not allow the film to be shown publicly. Juvenile Liaison 1 revolved mainly around the activities of Sergeant Ray, whose preventive measures when dealing with young troublemakers fell mainly in the strong-arm category of approach. In Juvenile Liaison 2 Ray is contacted by phone but declines to make an appearance, hinting at misrepresentation and possible damage to his career.

See also
Criminalization
Youth rights

External links
Official website

1975 films
Films directed by Nick Broomfield
Documentary films about children
Documentary films about law enforcement
Juvenile law
British documentary films
1970s British films